Arthur Gore, 1st Earl of Arran PC (Ire) (1703 – 17 April 1773), known as Sir Arthur Gore, 3rd Baronet from 1741 to 1757 and as Viscount Sudley from 1758 to 1762, was an Irish politician.

Arran was the son of Sir Arthur Gore, 2nd Baronet, and Elizabeth Annesley, and was educated at Trinity College, Dublin. In 1727 he was elected to the Irish House of Commons for Donegal Borough, a seat he held until 1758. He was also High Sheriff of Wexford in 1738 and was admitted to the Irish Privy Council in 1748. In 1758 he was raised to the Peerage of Ireland as Baron Saunders, of Deeps in the County of Wexford, and Viscount Sudley, of Castle Gore in the County of Mayo. In 1762 he was further honoured when he was created Earl of Arran, of the Arran Islands in the County of Galway. This was the third occasion that the title Earl of Arran had been created in the Peerage of Ireland.

His sister Anne married John Browne, 1st Earl of Altamont in December 1729 and had ten children. Another sister Elizabeth married James Cuffe, and was the mother of seven children including James Cuffe, 1st Baron Tyrawley. Lord Arran married Jane Saunders, daughter of Richard Saunders (a grandson of the MP Henry Whitfield), in 1731. They had three sons and two daughters. He died in April 1773 and was succeeded in his titles by his eldest son Arthur.

Notes

References
Kidd, Charles, Williamson, David (editors). Debrett's Peerage and Baronetage (1990 edition). New York: St Martin's Press, 1990.

1703 births
1773 deaths
Irish MPs 1727–1760
Gore, Arthur
Gore, Arthur
High Sheriffs of Wexford
Arthur
Earls of Arran (Ireland)
Peers of Ireland created by George II